Jasmine Monique Salinas (born January 4, 1992) is an NHRA drag racer, currently driving a Top Alcohol dragster for Scrappers Racing.

Racing Career 
Salinas debuted in Top Alcohol Dragster in 2019 at the 50th Anniversary of the Gatornationals in Gainnesville, Floriday, alongside her sister. Her first career national event win came March 14, 2022 at the AMALIE Motor Oil NHRA Nationals in Gainesville, Florida, exactly one year after her crash at the same race. In 2021 she finished sixth in National points and second in Divisional points with one win. In 2019 she finished her rookie season 15th in points with one final round appearance.

In 2021 during the AMALIE Motor Oil NHRA Nationals in Gainesville, Florida, Salinas experienced a blowover crash during the final round of qualifying. The car went airborne as she passed the 1/8 mile and flew across the track, over the guardrail, and flipped several times until eventually coming to a stop in the outside embankment. She was able to crawl out of the car under her own power and was later transported to a local hospital for evaluation. She suffered bruising but no major injuries. She finished the 2021 season 6th in National Standings and 2nd in Regional Standings.

Personal life  
Salinas is of Dutch-Indonesian and Mexican-Commanche-Spanish-French descent; her family resides in the San Francisco Bay Area in California. She is the oldest of four girls. She is the daughter of NHRA Top Fuel driver Mike Salinas and the sister of Pro Stock Motorcycle rider Jianna Salinas.

She attended The University of San Francisco where she studied Mandarin Chinese and received a degree in Global Studies.

Salinas was the subject of a documentary, Five Foot 280 in 2019 which was accepted into several film festivals.

References 

University of San Francisco alumni

1992 births
Living people
dragster drivers